Maria Muldaur (born Maria Grazia Rosa Domenica D'Amato; September 12, 1942) is an American folk and blues singer who was part of the American folk music revival in the early 1960s. She recorded the 1973 hit song "Midnight at the Oasis" and has recorded albums in the folk, blues, early jazz, gospel, country, and R&B traditions.

She was the wife of musician Geoff Muldaur and is the mother of singer-songwriter Jenni Muldaur.

Biography
Muldaur was born in Greenwich Village, New York City, where she attended Hunter College High School.

Muldaur cites as early musical influences classic country music by Kitty Wells, Hank Williams, Hank Snow, Hank Thompson, Ernest Tubb, and Bob Wills and the Texas Playboys; early rhythm and blues artists like Chuck Willis, Little Richard, Ruth Brown, Fats Domino, and Muddy Waters; Alan Freed "rock 'n' roll" shows; and doo-wop groups such as The Platters and The Five Satins.

Muldaur began her career in the early 1960s as Maria D'Amato, performing with John Sebastian, David Grisman, and Stefan Grossman as a member of the Even Dozen Jug Band. She then joined Jim Kweskin & the Jug Band as a featured vocalist and occasional fiddle player. During this time, she was part of the Greenwich Village scene that included Bob Dylan, and some of her recollections of the period, particularly with respect to Dylan, appear in Martin Scorsese's 2005 documentary film No Direction Home.

She married fellow Jug Band member Geoff Muldaur, and after the Kweskin group broke up, the couple produced two albums. She began her solo career when their marriage ended in 1972 but retained her married name.

Her first solo album, Maria Muldaur, released in 1973, contained her hit single "Midnight at the Oasis", which reached number 6 on the Billboard Hot 100 in 1974. It also peaked at number 21 on the UK Singles Chart. Later that year, she released her second album, Waitress in a Donut Shop. This included a re-recording of "I'm a Woman", the Leiber and Stoller number first associated with Peggy Lee and a standout feature from her Jug Band days. Her version of the song peaked at #12 on the Billboard Hot 100, and was her last Hot 100 hit in the U.S. to date. The title of this album is taken from a line in another song on the album, "Sweetheart", by Ken Burgan.

Around this time, Muldaur established a relationship with the Grateful Dead. Opening for some Grateful Dead shows in the summer of 1974, with John Kahn, bassist of the Jerry Garcia Band, eventually earned her a seat in that group as a backing vocalist in the late 1970s. Around the same time Muldaur met and eventually collaborated with bluegrass icon Peter Rowan. The two became close, and she was chosen to be the godmother of his daughter Amanda Rowan. She appeared on Super Jam (1989), the live recording of the German TV series Villa Fantastica, with Brian Auger on piano, Pete York on drums, Dick Morrissey on tenor saxophone, Roy Williams on trombone, Harvey Weston on bass and Zoot Money, also on vocals.

Around 1980, Muldaur became a Christian and released a live album, Gospel Nights, and a studio album, There Is A Love. In 1983 she returned to secular music with Sweet and Slow, a set informed by vintage jazz and blues.

Muldaur continued to perform, tour, and record after her success in the mid 1970s, including a turn at the Teatro ZinZanni in 2001.

Her 2005 release Sweet Lovin' Ol' Soul was nominated for both a Blues Music Award (formerly the W.C. Handy Award) and a Grammy Award in the Traditional Blues category. In 2013, she was nominated for a Blues Music Award in the Koko Taylor Award (Traditional Blues Female) category.

In 2003, Muldaur performed at Carnegie Hall in the Tribute to Peggy Lee produced by Richard Barone. In 2018 she performed in Barone's Central Park concert Music & Revolution along with John Sebastian and others from her Greenwich Village days.

In 2019, she received the Trailblazer award at the Americana Music Honors & Awards.

In 2021, Muldaur recorded and released the album Let's Get Happy Together, a 40-minute, 12-track album in collaboration with Tuba Skinny.

Discography

Even Dozen Jug Band
 The Even Dozen Jug Band (1964, credited as Maria D'Amato) (Elektra, EKS-7246)

Jim Kweskin & the Jug Band
 Jug Band Music (1965, credited as Maria D'Amato) (Vanguard, VDS-79163)
 See Reverse Side for Title (1966, credited as Maria D'Amato) (Vanguard, VDS-79234)
 Garden of Joy (1967) (Reprise, RS-6266)
 The Best of Jim Kweskin & the Jug Band (1968, compilation, credited as Maria D'Amato) (Vanguard, VDS-79270)

Geoff & Maria Muldaur
 Pottery Pie (1969) (Reprise, RS-6350)
 Sweet Potatoes (1972) (Reprise, MS-2073)

Solo

Jerry Garcia Band
 Cats Under the Stars (1978, Arista)
 Pure Jerry: Warner Theatre, March 18, 1978 (2005, Jerry Made)
 Pure Jerry: Bay Area 1978 (2009, Jerry Made)
 Garcia Live Volume Four (2014, ATO)

Paul Butterfield's Better Days
Better Days (1973, Bearsville) – on tracks 5, 7, and 8
It All Comes Back (1973, Bearsville) – credited as "vocals", but no specific tracks given

Other contributions
Wendy Waldman, Love Has Got Me (1973, Warner Bros.) – Background vocals on "Lee's Traveling Song"
Linda Ronstadt, Heart Like a Wheel (1974, Capitol) – Harmony vocals on "Heart Like A Wheel"
Wendy Waldman, Gypsy Symphony (1974, Warner Bros.) – Background vocals on "Come On Down"
Linda Ronstadt, Prisoner In Disguise (1975, Elektra) – harmonies/background vocals on "You Tell Me That I'm Falling Down"
The Doobie Brothers, Stampede (1975, Warner Bros.) – Vocals on "I Cheat the Hangman" 
Elvin Bishop, Hog Heaven (1978, Capricorn) – on two songs
Terry Robb, Stop This World (1996, Burnside BCD-0025)
Johnny's Blues: A Tribute to Johnny Cash (2003, Northern Blues)

References

External links
 Official website
 Illustrated Even Dozen Jug Band discography

1943 births
American women singers
American folk singers
American people of Italian descent
Black Top Records artists
Reprise Records artists
Warner Records artists
Hunter College High School alumni
Living people
People from Greenwich Village
Singers from New York City
Jerry Garcia Band members
Even Dozen Jug Band members
21st-century American women